William Ross Bulloch (June 7, 1884 – June 19, 1954) was a Canadian politician.  He was a Member of the  Legislative Assembly of Quebec.

Background

He was born in Dunoon, Scotland on June 7, 1884.

Member of the legislature

Bulloch was elected to Quebec's legislative assembly in the provincial riding of Westmount in the 1936 election and sat with the Union Nationale caucus. He lost re-election as a Conservative in the district of Montréal-Notre-Dame-de-Grâce in the 1939 election.

City Councillor

He served as a city councillor in Montreal from 1944 until his death.

Death

Bulloch died on June 19, 1954 in Montreal.

References

1884 births
1954 deaths
Montreal city councillors
Scottish emigrants to Canada
Union Nationale (Quebec) MNAs